This is a list of members of the Victorian Legislative Assembly in Australia from the elections of 2–19 August 1861 to the elections of October–November 1864.

Note the "Term in Office" refers to that members term(s) in the Assembly, not necessarily for that electorate.

 Brodribb resigned in March 1862; replaced by George Higinbotham in an April 1862 by-election
 H. Chapman resigned in February 1862; replaced by James McCulloch in a March 1862 by-election
 J. Chapman was disqualified in October 1861; replaced by Alexander John Smith in a November 1861 by-election
 Casey was unseated on petition in March 1862; replaced by Robert Frederick Howard in a March 1862 by-election
 Costello was expelled in November 1861; replaced by John Sinclair in a November 1861 by-election
 Denovan resigned in July 1862; replaced by Robert Strickland in a November 1862 by-election
 Everard was disqualified in August 1861 (insolvent); replaced by George Mackay in an August 1861 by-election. Mackay resigned in April 1864; replaced in turn by Everard in an April 1864 by-election
 Flint resigned March 1862; replaced by Tharp Girdlestone in an April 1862 by-election
 Gillespie resigned in March 1862; replaced by Mark Morrell Pope in a March 1862 by-election
 Gray resigned in September 1862; replaced by John MacGregor in a November 1862 by-election
 Hedley resigned in October 1862; replaced by John Johnson in a November 1862 by-election
 Ireland resigned in April 1864; replaced by Samuel MacGregor in a May 1864 by-election
 Ireland won both Maryborough and "Villiers and Heytesbury", he resigned from the former; replaced by George S. Evans in an October 1861 by-election
 Jones resigned in March 1863; replaced by John Thompson in an April 1863 by-election
 Manifold resigned in November 1861; replaced by John Wood in a December 1861 by-election
 Nixon left the Assembly in July 1863; replaced by Archibald Michie sworn-in August 1863
 Owens resigned around July 1863; replaced by James Joseph Casey sworn-in August 1863
 Pyke resigned in June 1862; replaced by George Allen Smyth in a November 1862 by-election
 Reid was disqualified in May 1862; replaced by John Orr in a March 1862 by-election
 Service resigned around August 1862; replaced by George Morton in a November by-election
 W. Smith resigned in January 1864; replaced by Robert Lewis sworn-in February 1864; Lewis resigned c. July 1864

References

Members of the Parliament of Victoria by term
19th-century Australian politicians